Cystolepiota potassiovirens is a species of mushroom producing fungus in the family Agaricaceae.

Taxonomy 
It was described in 1989 by the German mycologist Rolf Singer who classified it as Cystolepiota potassiovirens.

Description 
Cystolepiota potassiovirens is a very small brownish mushroom with brown flesh.

Cap: 1cm wide and convex with a small umbo. The surface is brown to dark brown with a pale orange umbo covered with furfuraceous (bran like) scales. Gills: Free, dark brown and close to crowded. They have a slight ventricose bulge in the middle. Stem: 1.7cm tall and 0.8-1mm thick and subequal. The surface is dark brown with a pruinose (powdery) coating. Spores: Ellipsoidal without a germ pore, hyaline, non-amyloid but greenish in KOH. 3.3-4 x 2.5-3μm. Basidia: 15-21 x 5 μm. Four spored. Smell: Indistinct.

Etymology 
The specific epithet potassiovirens derives from the Latin potassio meaning potassium and virens meaning green. This is in reference to the green colouration the spores develop in Potassium Hydroxide (KOH).

Habitat and distribution 
The specimens studied by Singer were found growing solitary or gregariously on the ground in the tropical forests of Brazil, 30km North of Manaus.

References 

Agaricaceae
Fungi described in 1989
Fungi of South America
Taxa named by Rolf Singer